In mathematics, the Stieltjes constants are the numbers  that occur in the Laurent series expansion of the Riemann zeta function:

The constant  is known as the Euler–Mascheroni constant.

Representations

The Stieltjes constants are given by the limit

 

(In the case n = 0, the first summand requires evaluation of 00, which is taken to be 1.)

Cauchy's differentiation formula leads to the integral representation

Various representations in terms of integrals and infinite series are given in works of Jensen, Franel, Hermite, Hardy, Ramanujan, Ainsworth, Howell, Coppo, Connon, Coffey, Choi, Blagouchine and some other authors. In particular, Jensen-Franel's integral formula, often erroneously attributed to Ainsworth and Howell, states that
 
where δn,k is the Kronecker symbol (Kronecker delta). Among other formulae, we find
 
 
 
see.

As concerns series representations, a famous series implying an integer part of a logarithm was given by Hardy in 1912
 
Israilov gave semi-convergent series in terms of Bernoulli numbers 
 
Connon, Blagouchine and Coppo gave several series with the binomial coefficients
 
where Gn are Gregory's coefficients, also known as reciprocal logarithmic numbers (G1=+1/2, G2=−1/12, G3=+1/24, G4=−19/720,... ). 
More general series of the same nature include these examples
 
and 
 
or
 
 
respectively (note that ).
Oloa and Tauraso showed that series with harmonic numbers may lead to Stieltjes constants
 
Blagouchine obtained slowly-convergent series involving unsigned Stirling numbers of the first kind

 
as well as semi-convergent series with rational terms only
 
where m=0,1,2,... In particular, series for the first Stieltjes constant has a surprisingly simple form
 
where Hn is the nth harmonic number.
More complicated series for Stieltjes constants are given in works of Lehmer, Liang, Todd, Lavrik, Israilov, Stankus, Keiper, Nan-You, Williams, Coffey.

Bounds and asymptotic growth

The Stieltjes constants satisfy the bound

given by Berndt in 1972. Better bounds in terms of elementary functions were obtained by Lavrik

by Israilov

with k=1,2,... and C(1)=1/2, C(2)=7/12,... , by Nan-You and Williams

by Blagouchine

where Bn are Bernoulli numbers, and by Matsuoka

As concerns estimations resorting to non-elementary functions and solutions, Knessl, Coffey and Fekih-Ahmed obtained quite accurate results. For example, Knessl and Coffey give the following formula that approximates the Stieltjes constants relatively well for large n. If v is the unique solution of

where

Up to n = 100000, the Knessl-Coffey approximation correctly predicts the sign of γn with the single exception of n = 137.

Numerical values

The first few values are 

{| class="wikitable"
| n || approximate value of γn || OEIS
|-
| 0 || +0.5772156649015328606065120900824024310421593359 || 
|-
| 1 || −0.0728158454836767248605863758749013191377363383 || 
|-
| 2 || −0.0096903631928723184845303860352125293590658061 || 
|-
| 3 || +0.0020538344203033458661600465427533842857158044 || 
|-
| 4 || +0.0023253700654673000574681701775260680009044694 || 
|-
| 5 || +0.0007933238173010627017533348774444448307315394 || 
|-
| 6 || −0.0002387693454301996098724218419080042777837151 || 
|-
| 7 || −0.0005272895670577510460740975054788582819962534 || 
|-
| 8 || −0.0003521233538030395096020521650012087417291805 || 
|-
| 9 || −0.0000343947744180880481779146237982273906207895 || 
|-
| 10 || +0.0002053328149090647946837222892370653029598537 || 
|-
| 100 || −4.2534015717080269623144385197278358247028931053 × 1017 ||
|-
| 1000 || −1.5709538442047449345494023425120825242380299554 × 10486 ||
|-
| 10000 || −2.2104970567221060862971082857536501900234397174 × 106883 ||
|-
| 100000 || +1.9919273063125410956582272431568589205211659777 × 1083432 ||
|}

For large n, the Stieltjes constants grow rapidly in absolute value, and change signs in a complex pattern.

Further information related to the numerical evaluation of Stieltjes constants may be found in works of Keiper, Kreminski, Plouffe, Johansson and Blagouchine. First, Johansson provided values of the Stieltjes constants up to n = 100000, accurate to over 10000 digits each (the numerical values can be retrieved from the LMFDB . Later, Johansson and Blagouchine devised a particularly efficient algorithm for computing generalized Stieltjes constants (see below) for large  and complex , which can be also used for ordinary Stieltjes constants.

Generalized Stieltjes constants

General information
More generally, one can define  Stieltjes constants γn(a) that occur in the Laurent series expansion of the Hurwitz zeta function:

Here a is a complex number with Re(a)>0. Since the Hurwitz zeta function is a generalization of the Riemann zeta function, we have γn(1)=γn The zeroth constant is simply the digamma-function γ0(a)=-Ψ(a), while other constants are not known to be reducible to any elementary or classical function of analysis. Nevertheless, there are numerous representations for them. For example, there exists the following asymptotic representation

due to Berndt and Wilton. The analog of Jensen-Franel's formula for the generalized Stieltjes constant is the Hermite formula

Similar representations are given by the following formulas:

and

Generalized Stieltjes constants satisfy the following recurrence relation

as well as the multiplication theorem

where  denotes the binomial coefficient (see and, pp. 101–102).

First generalized Stieltjes constant
The first generalized Stieltjes constant has a number of remarkable properties. 
 Malmsten's identity (reflection formula for the first generalized Stieltjes constants): the reflection formula for the first generalized Stieltjes constant has the following form

where m and n are positive integers such that m<n.
This formula has been long-time attributed to Almkvist and Meurman who derived it in 1990s. However, it was recently reported that this identity, albeit in a slightly different form, was first obtained by Carl Malmsten in 1846.

 Rational arguments theorem: the first generalized Stieltjes constant at rational argument may be evaluated in a quasi-closed form via the following formula

see Blagouchine. An alternative proof was later proposed by Coffey and several other authors.

 Finite summations: there are numerous summation formulae for the first generalized Stieltjes constants. For example,

For more details and further summation formulae, see.

 Some particular values: some particular values of the first generalized Stieltjes constant at rational arguments may be reduced to the gamma-function, the first Stieltjes constant and elementary functions. For instance,

At points 1/4, 3/4 and 1/3, values of first generalized Stieltjes constants were independently obtained by Connon and Blagouchine

At points 2/3, 1/6 and 5/6

These values were calculated by Blagouchine. To the same author are also due

Second generalized Stieltjes constant
The second generalized Stieltjes constant is much less studied than the first constant. Similarly to the first generalized Stieltjes constant, the second generalized Stieltjes constant at rational argument may be evaluated via the following formula

see Blagouchine.
An equivalent result was later obtained by Coffey by another method.

References 

Zeta and L-functions
Mathematical constants